Yevhen Kyrylovych Marchuk (28 January 1941 – 5 August 2021) was a Ukrainian politician, intelligence officer, and general who served as the fourth Prime Minister of Ukraine after its independence in 1991. During his career, Marchuk served in various other positions within the Ukrainian state apparatus, among them secretary of the National Security and Defense Council, Chief of the Security Service of Ukraine, a People's Deputy of Ukraine, and Defense Minister of Ukraine.

Early life and career
Yevhen Marchuk was born shortly before Operation Barbarossa, into a peasant family in Central Ukraine. In 1963, upon graduation from the Kirovohrad Pedagogical Institute, Marchuk was recruited by the KGB and steadily rose through the ranks of that organization.

As an operative officer, Marchuk first served in Kirovohrad Oblast before later joining the Ukrainian SSR's KGB branch in Kyiv as an intelligence and secret service officer for a total of 31 years of service. Marchuk admitted to specializing in secret police functions. However, he claimed to have been a humane lawful agent, secretly protecting some Ukrainian Soviet dissidents from harsh persecution.

Ukrainian intelligence career 
In the early 1990s, Marchuk was one of the first high-level KGB officers who appeared to be supportive of the then-recent Declaration of Independence of Ukraine, and was one of the founders of the Security Service of Ukraine, serving as its first chief from November 1991 to July 1994.

At first, Marchuk was appointed as the Ukrainian SSR's Minister of National Security and Defence - a position which held no actual power, as local KGB units, militsiya, and the army remained subordinate to Moscow until 1991. The Soviet Union then collapsed, ending Marchuk's service to the KGB, and he was able to participate fully in the Ukrainian independent government. He headed the Secret Service of Ukraine until 1994.

Political career 
After the 1994 Ukrainian parliamentary election, Marchuk became head of the liberal Social Market Choice faction, whose members included former President of Ukraine Leonid Kravchuk.

Prime Minister of Ukraine 
Marchuk was appointed acting Prime Minister of Ukraine on 1 March 1995, having previously held the position of the First Vice Premier Minister in the cabinet of Vitaliy Masol since 1 July 1994. He was later promoted to the position of the Prime Minister on 8 June 1995. He formed his cabinet, which was confirmed on 3 July 1995. After being elected to the Verkhovna Rada in December 1995, he resigned on 27 May 1996.

Later political career 
Marchuk and Kravchuk became members of the Social Democratic Party of Ukraine (united) before the 1998 Ukrainian parliamentary election. From April to December 1998, Marchuk was the leader of the party, and from July 1998 Marchuk also headed a parliamentary committee in Social Policy and Labor.

When the SDPU(o) refused to back Marchuk in the 1999 Ukrainian presidential election, he left to create his own Social Democratic Union. He ran as an independent in the 1999 presidential election, coming in fifth place with 8.13% of the vote in the first round of the elections, and was appointed secretary of the National Security and Defense Council by the re-elected President Leonid Kuchma.

Marchuk was secretary of the National Security and Defense Council from 10 November 1999 until 25 June 2003. Until June 2009, he stayed on as chairperson of the council's interagency commission on information policy. Later, he was the Defense Minister of Ukraine from June 2003 to September 2004.

Marchuk strongly supported the launching of Ukrayinska Pravda by Georgiy Gongadze.

Marchuk was pivotal in having Leonid Derkach fired in 2001, following the Cassette Scandal.

During the 2006 Ukrainian parliamentary election, Marchuk led the Electoral Bloc of Yevhen Marchuk and Unity of Oleksandr Omelchenko, which included his own party, the Party of Freedom. The Electoral Bloc not make it into the Verkhovna Rada, winning only 0.06% of the votes.

Later life and death 
In May 2008, Marchuk was appointed one of the personal advisors to President Viktor Yushchenko.

In June 2015, he was appointed by President Poroshenko a Ukrainian special representative in one of the subgroups of the Trilateral Contact Group on Ukraine. Marchuk again represented Ukraine in the Trilateral Contact Group from November 2018 to May 2019.

Death
Marchuk died on 5 August 2021, aged 80. According to a report by the Security Service of Ukraine, he died from acute pulmonary heart failure that was exacerbated by a COVID-19 infection.

References

1941 births
2021 deaths
People from Kirovohrad Oblast
Prime Ministers of Ukraine
KGB officers
Directors of the Security Service of Ukraine
Defence ministers of Ukraine
Unity (Ukraine) politicians
Second convocation members of the Verkhovna Rada
Third convocation members of the Verkhovna Rada
Social Democratic Party of Ukraine (united) politicians
Social Democratic Union (Ukraine) politicians
Generals of the Army (Ukraine)
Candidates in the 1999 Ukrainian presidential election
Commanders with Star of the Order of Merit of the Republic of Poland
Recipients of the Order of Prince Yaroslav the Wise, 5th class
Recipients of the Order of the Red Banner of Labour
Secretaries of National Security and Defense Council of Ukraine
First vice prime ministers of Ukraine
Deaths from the COVID-19 pandemic in Ukraine
Burials at Baikove Cemetery